Emperor Xianzong of Western Xia (1181–1226), born Li Dewang, was the ninth and penultimate emperor of the Western Xia dynasty of China, reigning from 1223 to 1226. He was the second son of the Emperor Shenzong who had abdicated in his favor.

Reign
Emperor Xianzong inherited a weak empire as his predecessors' Emperor Xiangzong and Emperor Shenzong whose reckless attacks on the Jin dynasty and attempts to ally with the Mongols drained the economy. Emperor Xianzong changed his predecessors' policies and decided to ally with Jin dynasty. However, the Jin dynasty was under a barrage of assault from the Mongol Empire and was unable to help out Western Xia. Emperor Xianzong also changed the policy for Mongols. He decided to fight against the Mongol invaders instead of allying with them. However, the Western Xia armies were exhausted from long, incessant, and costly wars against the Jin, and were unable to repel the Mongol assaults. Xianzong died in 1226.

References 

1181 births
1226 deaths
Western Xia emperors
13th-century Chinese monarchs
13th-century Tangut rulers
12th-century Tangut people